The 2014–15 Marshall Thundering Herd women's basketball team represents the Marshall University during the 2014–15 NCAA Division I women's basketball season. The Thundering Herd, led by third year head coach Matt Daniel, play their home games at the Cam Henderson Center and were members of Conference USA. They finished the season 17–15, 8–10 for in C-USA play to finish in ninth place. They lost in the quarterfinals of the C-USA women's tournament to Charlotte. They were invited to the Women's Basketball Invitational where defeated Northern Kentucky in the first round before losing to Mercer in the quarterfinals.

Roster

Rankings

Schedule

|-
!colspan=9 style="background:#009B48; color:#FFFFFF;"| Regular season

|-
!colspan=9 style="background:#009B48; color:#FFFFFF;"| Conference USA Women's Tournament

|-
!colspan=9 style="background:#009B48; color:#FFFFFF;"| WBI

See also
2014–15 Marshall Thundering Herd men's basketball team

References

Marshall Thundering Herd women's basketball seasons
Marshall
Marshall
2014 in sports in West Virginia
Marsh